Nindu Samsaram is a 1968 Telugu-language drama film directed by C. S. Rao. The film stars N. T. Rama Rao and Krishna Kumari, with music composed by Master Venu.

Plot
Bhaskar is an honest, truthful gentleman who is in search of a job. Bhaskar has a family, a blind father Brahmaiah (V. Nagayya), a mother Saraswatamma (Hemalatha), and a disabled sister Shanta (Anitha), who are staying along with his shrewd sister-in-law Tulasamma (S. Varalakshmi) and incapable elder brother Ranganatham (Prabhakar Reddy). Once Bhaskar finds a purse of a lorry driver Subbarayudu (Jagga Rao) with money and he hands it over to him. Subbarayudu & his sister Seeta (Dubbing Janaki) are grateful to Bhaskar, he asks him to stay with them and also gets a job in his company. Tulasamma takes away the money sent by Bhaskar and always accuses her in-laws. Shanta writes a letter to Bhaskar regarding it, and he immediately moves and in between, he gets acquainted with a beautiful girl Jyothi (Krishna Kumari). After reaching home Bhaskar witnesses Tulasamma's misbehavior towards his parents, so, he takes them to the city. They all take shelter at Brahmaiah's childhood friend Somayya's (Ramana Reddy) house and Somaiah's son Mohan loves Shanta. Bhaskar starts working at various places when Jyothi spots his honesty and appoints him to their company by recommending him to her father Zamindar Umakanta Rao (Relangi). Unfortunately, Ranganatham also works at the same place and he warns his brother not to reveal their relationship. Meanwhile, Bhaskar & Jyothi fall in love. On the other side, Tulasamma's brother Maya (Padmanabham) a cheat, decides to deceive Umakanta Rao and grab his property by marrying Jyothi. During a function at Umakanta Rao's house, Tulasamma's son steals gold bangles which Bhaskar notices and takes the blame on him when he loses his job. Umakantha Rao denies Jyothi's wish and fixes the alliance with Maya. At the same time, Brahmaiah & Sommaiah makes the marriage arrangements for their children which Tulasamma plans to break out. So, she provokes Umakantha Rao along with Maya to recover the debt amount which Somaiah has taken from him. During the time of engagement, Ranganatham arrives and forces Somaiah to repay the amount, otherwise, his house will be sealed. Listening to it, Brahmaiah gets a heart attack and dies. Here, Ranganatham realises his mistake and reforms himself. Eventually, Shanta is not able to tolerate the situation, so, she leaves to commit suicide when Bhaskar saves her, he observes another girl also trying to commit suicide and He recognises her Seeta. Bhaskar takes her to his house where he understands she has been created by a person who is none other than Maya. Now Bhaskar gives assurance to both sisters, first of all, he decides to repay the debt of Umakantha Rao for which he participates in a car race. On the other side, Jyothi brings out the real faces of Maya & Tulasamma where Umakanta Rao realises his mistake, makes Maya in a mindful condition, and performs his marriage with Seeta. Looking at it, Tulasamma wants to take revenge against Bhaskar, so, he sends goons to kill him. Knowing it, Ranganatham squashes out Tulasamma, lands to protect his brother, and gets wounded when Tulasamma is also under contrition and says sorry to everyone. Finally, the entire family is reunited and the movie ends on a happy note with the marriage of Bhaskar & Jyothi.

Cast
N. T. Rama Rao as Bhaskar
Krishna Kumari as Jyothi
V. Nagayya as Brahmaiah
Relangi as Umakanta Rao
Ramana Reddy as Somaiah
Prabhakar Reddy as Ranganatham
Padmanabham as S. S. Mayya
Balakrishna as Appanna
Jagga Rao as Subba Rayudu
S. Varalakshmi as Tulasamma
Hemalatha as Saraswatamma
Vijaya Lalitha
Rama Prabha as Subbulu
Anitha as Shanti
Dubbing Janaki as Seeta

Soundtrack
Music was composed by Master Venu.

References

External links
 

1960s Telugu-language films
1968 drama films
Films directed by C. S. Rao
Films scored by Master Venu
Indian drama films